Vladimir Karabutov (born 22 April 1967) is a Russian former water polo player. He competed at the 1992 and 1996 Summer Olympics and finished in third and fifth place, respectively. He won another bronze medal at the 1991 European Championships.

See also
 List of Olympic medalists in water polo (men)

References

External links
 

1967 births
Living people
Soviet male water polo players
Russian male water polo players
Olympic water polo players of the Unified Team
Olympic water polo players of Russia
Water polo players at the 1992 Summer Olympics
Water polo players at the 1996 Summer Olympics
Olympic bronze medalists for the Unified Team
Olympic medalists in water polo
Medalists at the 1992 Summer Olympics
Sportspeople from Volgograd